The weed shiner (Notropis texanus) is a North American species of freshwater fish in the cyprinid genus Notropis. Prior to 1958, this species was named Notropis roseus.

Description 
The weed shiner, Notropis texanus, is a member of the family Cyprinidae. It is a medium-sized minnow with a broad, dark lateral band down and a dark spot at the base of the caudal fin. The posterior 3-4 anal rays often have a dark pigment. Weed shiners have a somewhat compressed body, a large terminal to subterminal mouth, a gently rounded snout, and an eye diameter less than or equal to its snout length. The lateral line system is completely pored with 34-36 scales and is slightly decurved anteriorly. The dorsal surface of this fish tends to be olive-yellow with a silvery overlay and has dark-edged scales, giving off a checkerboard appearance. The ventral surface is white with silver tones. Weed shiners have a total of 6-8 gill rakers, 8 dorsal rays, 7 anal rays, 13-14 pectoral rays, and 8 pelvic rays.

Diet 
Weed shiners feed during the day, with peaks in activity after sunrise or during mid-afternoon. During the wet season, their diet is mostly composed of organic detritus (81% by volume). During the wet season, their diet includes surface animal prey (20% by volume), midwater prey (5%), benthic animal prey (39%), and organic detritus (35%).

Habitat 
Weed shiners are commonly found in the lower third of the water column in small to moderate sized streams of slow to moderate flow. They can be found in man-made ponds, reservoirs, and natural oxbow lakes. Despite its name, these fish are prevalent in both vegetated and non-vegetated waterways.

Reproduction and life cycle 
Weed shiners spawn from March through September (sometimes early October), in water temperatures between 14-29° Celsius. Female weed shiners produce multiple clutches of eggs during the breeding season; therefore, it is hard to accurately estimate annual egg production.

Larval development has not yet been described in weed shiners. Growth of this species is very rapid in the beginning stages of development. They reach about 60% of their maximum length after one year of growth. Although some weed shiners manage to reach their fourth year of life, most of them die after their third year of life.

Distribution 
The weed shiner occurs in the Mississippi River Basin from Minnesota and Wisconsin down to the Gulf of Mexico. It ranges all throughout Gulf of Mexico drainage, from the Suwannee River of Florida and Georgia to the Nueces River of Texas, and is more abundant south of the Ohio-Tennessee River confluences. It has also been reported in the Red River of the North drainage in Minnesota and drainages of Lake Michigan and Lake Huron.

Etymology 
Notropis means "keeled back." Texanus is a reference to the type locality, Salado Creek, Texas.

See also 
 Shiner (fish)

References

Further reading
 Robert J. Goldstein, Rodney W. Harper, Richard Edwards: American Aquarium Fishes. Texas A&M University Press 2000, p. 96

External links 
 NatureServe Explorer 
 Outdoor Alabama 
 FishBase
 Fishes of Texas

Notropis
Freshwater fish of the Southeastern United States
Fish described in 1856
Taxa named by Charles Frédéric Girard